Vasily Kudinov (17 February 1969 – 11 February 2017) was a Russian handball player, born in Ilyinka, Astrakhan Oblast, Russian SFSR.

He participated in three Olympics, winning two gold medals and one bronze medal.

At the 1992 Summer Olympics he won a gold medal with the Unified Team at the Olympics.

He played for the Russia men's national handball team at the 2000 Summer Olympics in Sydney, where Russia won the gold medal.

Kudinov died on 11 February 2017, six days prior to his 48th birthday, in Astrakhan.

References

External links

1969 births
2017 deaths
People from Astrakhan Oblast
Russian male handball players
Olympic handball players of the Unified Team
Soviet male handball players
Olympic handball players of Russia
Handball players at the 1992 Summer Olympics
Handball players at the 1996 Summer Olympics
Handball players at the 2000 Summer Olympics
Handball players at the 2004 Summer Olympics
Olympic gold medalists for the Unified Team
Olympic gold medalists for Russia
Olympic bronze medalists for Russia
Olympic medalists in handball
Medalists at the 2004 Summer Olympics
Medalists at the 2000 Summer Olympics
Medalists at the 1992 Summer Olympics
Sportspeople from Astrakhan Oblast